Lee Beattie Mailler (March 17, 1898 – September 22, 1967) was an American politician from New York.

Life
He was born on March 17, 1898, in Cornwall-on-Hudson, Orange County, New York, the son of William Henry Mailler (1861–1929) and Sophia Jane (Preston) Mailler (1864–1941). He attended Cornwall-on-Hudson High School and Eastman Gaines Business College. He married Marion MacKenzie (1907–1976). He was for 15 years Superintendent of the Cornwall Hospital, and was a director and treasurer of the Highland Telephone Company.

Mailler was a member of the New York State Assembly (Orange Co., 1st D.) in 1934, 1935, 1936, 1937, 1938, 1939–40, 1941–42, 1943–44, 1945–46, 1947–48, 1949–50, 1951–52 and 1953–54.

He was Chairman of the New York State Parole Board from June 1954 to September 15, 1958.

He died on September 22, 1967, in Cornwall Hospital in Cornwall, New York, of leukemia; and was buried at the Cemetery of the Highlands in Highland Mills.

Sources

1898 births
1967 deaths
Republican Party members of the New York State Assembly
People from Cornwall-on-Hudson, New York
Deaths from leukemia
20th-century American politicians